Milton Moore Snodgrass (July 9, 1931 – August 13, 2014) was an American author.

Born July 9, 1931 in Linesville, Pennsylvania to Clifford Marshall and Anna (Moore) Snodgrass. Received Ph.D. 1956 Purdue University. Was part of the Department of Agricultural Economics and Agricultural Business, New Mexico State University, Las Cruces, New Mexico.

Snodgrass died in 2014 at Memorial Medical Center in Las Cruces.

Works

References
Contemporary Authors Online, Gale, 2006. Reproduced in Biography Resource Center. Farmington Hills, Mich.: Thomson Gale. 2006. http://galenet.galegroup.com/servlet/BioRC
Obituary https://www.bacasfuneralchapelslascruces.com/obituary/6013450

1931 births
2014 deaths
People from Linesville, Pennsylvania
American male non-fiction writers
Economists from Pennsylvania